Miami is the autonym for the Miami people once of Ohio, Indiana, and Michigan.

While there is no longer any place in the U.S. state of Ohio known simply as Miami, the term is a part of the name of several places in Ohio, as follows:

Geographical features
Great Miami River, a tributary of the Ohio River
Little Miami River, a tributary of the Ohio River

Populated places
Miami Villa, Ohio, unincorporated community in Montgomery County
Miamisburg, Ohio, city in Montgomery County
Miamitown, Ohio, unincorporated community in Hamilton County
Miamiville, Ohio, unincorporated community in Clermont county
New Miami, Ohio, village in Butler County

County and county subdivisions
Miami County, Ohio
Miami Township, Clermont County, Ohio
Miami Township, Greene County, Ohio
Miami Township, Hamilton County, Ohio
Miami Township, Logan County, Ohio
Miami Township, Montgomery County, Ohio

Historical place names
Fort Miami (Ohio), a fort built on the Maumee River

Other uses
Miami Valley, a term for the Dayton metropolitan area
Miami University, in Oxford
Miami RedHawks, the intercollegiate sports program of Miami University
Miami and Erie Canal, canal in Ohio that used to run from Toledo to Cincinnati